Amerigo Severini (11 May 1931 – 1 April 2020) was an Italian cyclist. He competed in cyclo-cross, and won three national championships and medalled four times at the World Championships.

Major results

Cyclo-cross

1954–1955
 2nd National Championships
 3rd  World Championships
1955–1956
 1st  National Championships
1957–1958
 2nd  World Championships
1958–1959
 3rd  World Championships
1959–1960
 2nd National Championships
1960–1961
 1st  National Championships
 6th World Championships
1962–1963
 1st  National Championships
 4th World Championships
1963–1964
 2nd National Championships
 6th World Championships
1964–1965
 2nd National Championships
 3rd  World Championships
1965–1966
 2nd National Championships
 6th World Championships

Road
1951
 1st Bologna–Passo della Raticosa

References

1931 births
2020 deaths
Italian male cyclists
Cyclo-cross cyclists
Sportspeople from the Province of Ancona
Cyclists from Marche